The Brant Haldimand Norfolk Catholic District School Board (BHNCDSB, known as English-language Separate District School Board No. 51 prior to 1999) is a separate school board in Ontario, Canada. The school board is the school district administrator for the communities of the County of Brant, Haldimand County, and Norfolk County, Ontario.

History
The Brant Haldimand Norfolk Catholic District School Board was a merger of two school boards, the Haldimand-Norfolk Roman Catholic Separate School Board and the Brant County Roman Catholic Separate School Board. The two boards merged in 1998 into a new board English-language Separate District School Board No. 51 and became known as the Brant Haldimand Norfolk Catholic District School Board. French schools operated by Le conseil des écoles séparées catholiques de Haldimand-Norfolk and Le conseil des écoles séparées catholiques du comté de Brant became part of French-language Separate District School Board No. 64 which became later known as the Conseil scolaire de district catholique Centre-Sud.

Elementary schools
Blessed Sacrament 
Christ the King
Holy Cross
Holy Family
Madonna Della Libera, Brantford
Notre Dame, Brantford
Notre Dame, Caledonia
Our Lady of Fatima
Our Lady of Providence
Resurrection
Sacred Heart, Langton
Sacred Heart, Paris
St. Basil
St. Bernard of Clairvaux
St. Cecilia
St. Frances Cabrini
St. Gabriel
St. Joseph's
St. Leo
St. Mary's, Hagersville
St. Michael's, Dunnville
St. Michael's, Walsh
St. Patrick's, Caledonia
St. Patrick, Brantford
St. Peter
St. Pius X
St. Stephen's
St. Theresa

Secondary schools
Assumption College, Brantford
Holy Trinity Catholic High School, Simcoe 
Sprucedale Secondary School, Simcoe (educational programming for young offenders held at Sprucedale Youth Centre)
St. Mary's Catholic Learning Centre, Brantford
St. John's College, Brantford

See also
List of school districts in Ontario
List of high schools in Ontario

References

External links
Official web site

Education in Norfolk County, Ontario
Education in Haldimand County
Roman Catholic school districts in Ontario
Education in Brantford
Educational institutions with year of establishment missing